Mark Daniel Cullen (born October 28, 1978) is an American former professional ice hockey center. He is the younger brother of former NHL forward, and three-time Stanley Cup champion Matt Cullen.

Playing career
Cullen was signed by the Minnesota Wild on April 8, 2002 after a four-year collegiate career at Colorado College. After three years of playing with the Houston Aeros of the AHL, Cullen signed with the Chicago Blackhawks on August 4, 2005. Splitting time with the Norfolk Admirals of the AHL and Chicago in the 2005–06 season, Cullen saw his first NHL action by playing in 29 games.

He signed with the Philadelphia Flyers in the off-season and played in three games with the Flyers in 2006–07, spending most of his time with affiliate, the Philadelphia Phantoms. Cullen signed with the Detroit Red Wings on July 5, 2007, playing for their minor league team, the Grand Rapids Griffins of the AHL. He then signed with the Vancouver Canucks on July 4, 2008. During the 2009–10 season, Cullen returned to the Chicago Blackhawks' organization and played for the Rockford IceHogs of the AHL.

On July 22, 2010, Cullen signed a one-year contract as a free agent with the Florida Panthers. Cullen missed the start of the 2010–11 season, after rupturing an Achilles Tendon at the Panthers training camp. On November 29, 2011, the Panthers recalled Cullen and he temporarily filled in as their fourth-line center for six games.

During the 2012–13 season, Cullen joined EC Red Bull Salzburg at the midpoint of their campaign for the remainder of the year from Vityaz Podolsk of the Kontinental Hockey League on December 16, 2012.

After his second season with Salzburg, Cullen left the defeated EBEL finalists for the Champions in Italian club, HC Bolzano, signing a one-year contract on August 20, 2014.

Cullen played three seasons in the Austrian league before moving as a free agent to the Neighbouring German DEL2 league, signing a one-year deal with Dresdner Eislöwen on September 23, 2015.

Career statistics

Regular season and playoffs

International

Awards and honors

References

External links

 

1978 births
American men's ice hockey centers
Bolzano HC players
Chicago Blackhawks players
Colorado College Tigers men's ice hockey players
Dresdner Eislöwen players
EC Red Bull Salzburg players
Fargo-Moorhead Ice Sharks players
Florida Panthers players
Grand Rapids Griffins players
Houston Aeros (1994–2013) players
Ice hockey players from Minnesota
Living people
Manitoba Moose players
Norfolk Admirals players
People from Moorhead, Minnesota
Philadelphia Flyers players
Philadelphia Phantoms players
Rochester Americans players
Rockford IceHogs (AHL) players
San Antonio Rampage players
Undrafted National Hockey League players
HC Vityaz players
AHCA Division I men's ice hockey All-Americans